The 1869 Waikouaiti by-election was a by-election held on 27 April 1869 in the  electorate during the 4th New Zealand Parliament.

The by-election was caused by the resignation of the incumbent MP Robert Mitchell.

The by-election was won by Francis Rich. As there were no other nominations, he was duly declared elected.

References

Waikouaiti, 1869
1869 elections in New Zealand
Politics of Otago
April 1869 events
Waikouaiti